Lebanon is an eastern Mediterranean country that has the most religiously diverse society within the Middle East, comprising 18 recognized religious sects. The primary religions are Islam (Sunni, Shia, and a  small number of Alawites and Ismailis) and Christianity (the Maronite Church, the Greek Orthodox Church, the Melkite Greek Catholic Church, Protestantism, the Armenian Apostolic Church). The Druze concern around an estimate of 5% of the citizens in Lebanon. Furthermore outside of Lebanon, Lebanese people (including diaspora) are mostly Christians. It is also estimated that a large proportion of its population are refugees (1.5 million out of a bit over 6 million in 2017), which affects statistics. The refugees, who mostly are of Syrian or Palestinian origin, are predominantly Sunni Muslim, hence also include Christians and Shia Muslims.

Lebanon differs from other Middle East countries where Muslims have become the majority after the civil war, and somewhat resembles Bosnia-Herzegovina and Albania; both in Southeastern Europe, in having a diverse mix of Muslims and Christians that each make up a large proportion of the country's population. Christians were once a majority inside Lebanon and are still a majority in the diaspora, which consists of nearly 14 million people. The president of the country is traditionally a Maronite Christian, the prime minister a Sunni Muslim, and the speaker of parliament a Shia Muslim.

Population by religious affiliation
No official census has been taken since 1932, reflecting the political sensitivity in Lebanon over confessional (i.e. religious) balance.
As a result, the religious affiliation of the Lebanese population is very difficult to establish with certainty and various sources are used to get the possible estimate of the population by religious affiliation.

The following are different sources that do not pretend to be fully representative of the religious affiliation of the people of Lebanon.

A 2012 study conducted by Statistics Lebanon, a Beirut-based research firm, estimated Lebanon's population to be 54% Muslim (27% Shia;  27% Sunni), 5% Druze, 35.5% Christian (21% Maronite, 8% Greek Orthodox, 6.5% other Christian groups), and a small number of other religious groups.

The CIA World Factbook estimates (2020) the following , though this data does not include Lebanon's sizable Syrian and Palestinian refugee populations: Muslim 67.8% (Sunni, Shia and smaller percentages of Alawites and Ismailis), Christian 32.4% (mainly Maronite Catholics are the largest Christian group), Druze 4.5%, and very small numbers of Jews, Baha'is, Buddhists, and Hindus.

The International Foundation for Electoral Systems provides a source for the registered voters in Lebanon for 2018 (it has to be noted that voter registration does not include people under 18 and unregistered voters) that puts the numbers as following: 
Sunni Islam 20.40%, Shia Islam 27.40%,
Maronite Catholic 25.52%, Greek Orthodox 8.15%, Druze 5.72%, Melkite Catholic 5.62%, Armenian Apostolic 2.64%, other Christian Minorities 1.28%, Alawite Shia Islam 0.88%, Armenian Catholic 0.62%, Evangelical Protestant 0.53%, and other 0.18% of the population.

Lebanon has a community of around 13,000 Hindus. There is a very small and ancient community of Zoroastrians numbering between 100-500 individuals. Lebanon also has a Jewish population estimated at less than 100.

Geographical distribution of sects in Lebanon

Lebanese Muslims

Lebanese Muslims form a large number of the total population, they are divided into many sects, which include Sunnis, Shias, Alawites, and Ismailis.

Lebanese Sunnis are mainly residents of the major cities: west Beirut, Tripoli, and Sidon. Sunnis are also present in rural areas, which include Akkar, Ikleem al Kharoub, and the western Beqaa Valley.

Lebanese Shias are concentrated in Southern Lebanon, Baalbek District, Hermel District and the south Beirut (southern parts of Greater Beirut).

Lebanese Druze

Under the Lebanese political division (Parliament of Lebanon Seat Allocation) the Druze community is combined  with Lebanon's Muslim community to form 50% of the parliament, despite the Druze and Muslims having very different beliefs. Most Druze do not identify as Muslims, and they do not accept the five pillars of Islam.

The Druze are located in the areas known as the Metn, Gharb, Chouf, Wadi-al Taym, Beirut and its suburbs, which are the modern day districts of Metn, Baabda, Aley, Chouf, Rashaya, Hasbaya and Beirut. The Druze make the majority in cities like Aley, Choueifat, Rashaya, Ras el-Matn and Baakline.

Lebanese Christians

Lebanese Christians are divided into many groups, several types of Catholics for instance the Maronites and Greek Catholics (Melkites), Greek Orthodox, Oriental Orthodox (among which are Syriacs, Armenians and Copts), Church of the East (Assyrians) and Protestants.

Lebanese Maronites are concentrated in the northern parts of Greater Beirut,  the northern part of Mount Lebanon Governorate, the southern part of North Governorate, parts of Beqaa Governorate and South Governorate.

Greek Catholics are found across the country but in particular in districts on the eastern slopes of the Lebanese mountain range and in Zahle where they are a majority.

Lebanese Greek Orthodox are concentrated in north Beirut, as well as Lebanese North areas including Zgharta, Bsharre, Koura, and Batroun.

Lebanese Protestants are concentrated mainly within the area of Beirut and Greater Beirut.

The other Lebanese Christians are concentrated also in similar areas like in east Beirut (northern parts of Greater Beirut), Mount Lebanon, Zahlé, and Jezzine.

Lebanese Jews

As of 2018, the Jews in Lebanon make up the smallest recognized religious group, with merely 29 persons or 0.08% of the population.

Religion and society

Religion and politics 
The Maronite Catholics and the Druze founded modern Lebanon in the early eighteenth century, through a governing and social system known as the "Maronite-Druze dualism" in the Mount Lebanon Mutasarrifate.
 
Religion plays a major role in politics; some researchers describe the political system in Lebanon as "coming out of the womb of religion and politics". After the independence from France in 1943, the leaders of Lebanon agreed on the distribution of the political positions in the country according to religious affiliation, known as the national pact. Since then, the President is always a Maronite Christian, the Prime Minister is at all times a Sunni Muslim and the Speaker of the Parliament must be a Shia Muslim.

Most political parties are based on sectarian belongingness and represent their religion's interests. It is not rare to find the clergy involved in political activities, either as members or as leaders.

Current political and religious issues
Under the terms of an agreement known as the National Pact between the various political and religious leaders of Lebanon, the president of the country must be a Maronite, the Prime Minister must be a Sunni, and the Speaker of Parliament must be a Shia.

Since Lebanon is a country that rules by a sectarian system, family matters such as marriage, divorce and inheritance are handled by the religious authorities representing a person's faith. Calls for civil marriage are unanimously rejected by the religious authorities but civil marriages conducted in another country are recognized by Lebanese civil authorities. In the case of Lebanon, many Lebanese couples therefore conducted their civil marriage in Cyprus, which became a well know destination for such instances.

Non-religion is not recognized by the state. However, following intense pressure and lobbying by the Civil Center for National Initiative, the Minister of the Interior Ziad Baroud made it possible to have a citizen's religious sect removed from his identity card in 2009.

In April 2010, Laïque Pride, a secular group co-founded by feminist Yalda Younes, called for "an end to the country's deep-rooted sectarian system" and for a "secular Lebanon". Laïque Pride supports the enacting of a unified Civil Code for the Personal Status Law.

On April 26, 2010, in response to Hizb ut-Tahrir's growing appeal in Beirut and demands to re-establish an Islamic caliphate, a Laïque Pride march was held in Beirut. Three days later, 70,000 gathered in Martyrs' Square, Beirut for a march organized by Laïque Pride.

In 2011, hundreds of protesters rallied in Beirut on 27 February in a Laïque Pride march, calling for reform of the country's confessional political system. At the same time, a peaceful sit-in took place in Saida.

At a march in May 2012 in which 600 participated, Laïque Pride issued six demands, four concerning women's rights and two concerning media freedom. Secular student clubs from Saint Joseph University (USJ), the Lebanese Academy of Fine Arts (ALBA), as the American University of Beirut (AUB) also participated in the march.

In October 2019, and until August 2020, a series of civil protests ensued in Lebanon, now known as the October Revolution condemning sectarian rule amongst a myriad of other issues plaguing their country. Lina Khatib, a journalist for Al-Jazeera, has labelled these protests as "cross-sectarian". She notes: "They are taking place across Lebanon, rather than only in Beirut. And they are demanding the fall of the government from the outset, while criticising political leaders from every sect."

Gallery

See also
 Christianity in Lebanon
 Islam in Lebanon
 History of the Jews in Lebanon
 Secularism in Lebanon
 Irreligion in Lebanon
 Freedom of religion in Lebanon
 Freemasonry in Lebanon
 Demographics of Lebanon

References